George Longman (1776-1822), of 22 Bloomsbury Square, Middlesex, was a politician.

He was a Member (MP) of the Parliament of the United Kingdom for Maidstone 1806-1812 and 1818–1820. His father, Thomas Longman (1699–1755), was the founder of the publishing company Longman. George Longman was also a major financial supporter of the inventor John Dickinson (1782–1869). Dickinson had developed a continuous mechanised papermaking process, the cylinder mould machine, close on the heels of the first mechanised paper machine of 1803, known to this day as the Fourdrinier. With Longmans backing he set up the company Longman & Dickinson in 1809 and bought in the same year his first paper mill at Apsley (Hertfordshire), which later developed into John Dickinson & Co. Ltd., a longtime international leader in papermaking and stationery.

References

1776 births
1822 deaths
People from Bloomsbury
Members of the Parliament of the United Kingdom for English constituencies
UK MPs 1806–1807
UK MPs 1807–1812
UK MPs 1818–1820